Nicu is both a masculine Romanian given name and a Romanian surname. Notable people with the name include:

Given name:
Nicu Ceaușescu (1951–1996), Romanian communist
Nicu Constantin (1938–2009), Romanian actor
Nicu Constantinescu (1840–1905), Romanian politician
Nicu Covaci (born 1947), Romanian painter and musician
Nicu Paleru (born 1973), Romanian Gypsy musician
Nicu Porsena (Ionescu) (1892–1971), Romanian writer
Nicu Stoian (born 1957), Romanian volleyball player
Nicu Vlad (born 1963), Romanian weightlifter

Surname:
Epaminonda Nicu (born 1979), Romanian footballer
Maximilian Nicu (born 1982), German-Romanian footballer

See also
 Neonatal intensive care unit (NICU)
 Neurosurgery intensive care unit (NICU) 
 Nicu's Spoon Theater Company, American theater company

Romanian-language surnames
Romanian masculine given names